The 2022 Sprecher 150 was the 15th stock car race of the 2022 ARCA Menards Series season, the 6th race of the 2022 ARCA Menards Series East season, the 8th race of the 2022 Sioux Chief Showdown, and the 2nd iteration of the event. The race was held on Sunday, August 28, 2022, in West Allis, Wisconsin at The Milwaukee Mile, a 1 mile (1.6 km) permanent oval-shaped short track. The race took the scheduled 150 laps to complete. Sammy Smith, driving for Kyle Busch Motorsports, put on a dominating performance, leading 122 laps for his third career ARCA Menards Series win, his seventh career ARCA Menards Series East win, along with his third and fourth of the seasons. To fill out the podium, Taylor Gray, driving for David Gilliland Racing, and Daniel Dye, driving for GMS Racing, would finish 2nd and 3rd, respectively.

Six female drivers competed in this race: Toni Breidinger, Amber Balcaen, Rita Thomason, Amber Slagle, Stephanie Moyer, and Mandy Chick, which is tied for the most female drivers competing in a single ARCA Menards Series race.

This was also the 400th ARCA start for veteran Brad Smith.

Entry list 

 (R) denotes rookie driver

Practice 
The only 45-minute practice session was held on Sunday, August 28, at 10:00 AM CST.

Qualifying 
Qualifying was held on Sunday, August 28, at 11:30 AM CST. The qualifying system used is a multiple-car, multiple-lap system with only one round. Whoever sets the fastest time in the round wins the pole.

Race results

Standings after the race 

Drivers' Championship standings

Note: Only the first 10 positions are included for the driver standings.

References

External links 

2022 ARCA Menards Series
2022 ARCA Menards Series East
NASCAR races at the Milwaukee Mile
Sprecher 150
2022 in sports in Wisconsin